"To Mars and Providence" is a short story by American writer Don Webb, published in War of the Worlds: Global Dispatches. It is a conflation of The War of the Worlds, the Cthulhu Mythos, and the biography of H. P. Lovecraft.

Plot summary
The story begins on August 12, 1898, twenty-nine days after the death of eight-year-old Howard Phillips Lovecraft's father. Howard observes a Martian cylinder crash into Federal Hill, an event that he had been predicting in his dreams for three years. Being a "gentleman of pure Yankee stock [of] the true chalk-white Nordic type", Howard decides to investigate the landing, and witnesses the opening of the cylinder and emergence of the Martian occupants. When the Martians fire upon onlookers with their heat rays, he faints.

Howard reawakens three days later in his home. His mother, blissfully ignorant of the danger in staying behind in Martian-occupied Providence, informs him that he was taken into the Martian cylinder, before being rescued by a Brown University librarian named Armitage. Howard observes the spread of the red weed and the movement of fighting machines and feels an intense longing to explore the crash site, but realizes that his mother will not let him. He resorts to drugging her with a sedative in her malted milk, before heading out into the city.

Howard arrives at St. John's Church, where he witnesses a tripod placing an artifact into the steeple and to which he feels the strong pull. Climbing to its top, he finds a glowing trapezohedron accompanied by a strange sound of distant flutes. Picking up the object, Lovecraft is surrounded by a shifting, sentient unearthly colour. It asks if he is "one of us," stating that prior to the invasion, a number of Martian minds were telepathically sent to occupy human bodies to report, with some failing to return. It begins to relate the story of the "Martians'" history to Howard.

The species originated in another solar system, emigrating to this one ages ago. They established two colonies, one on Mars that thrived and one in an area of Antarctica that was destroyed due to climate change. The survivors on Mars engaged in selective breeding programs that created an advanced, immortal physical form. As a side effect, some Martians developed the capability to engage in astral projection, and made contact with the other two races of the system: Humans on Earth, and a "fungoid race" on a distant planet.

The Martians engaged in trade with the fungoid race, entering a golden age and building "labyrinthine Cyclopean structures" before entering a decline marked with a population shrinkage and increasingly decadent artwork. However, this collapse ends with a discovery beneath Syrtis Major: an underground series of impenetrable vaults that the fungoid beings explained as being the home of the elder godlike beings that were Mars's first masters, and would return from their undead dreaming when the stars were aligned.

This discovery sent the normally cool and calculating Martians into a frenzy of terror, and they destroyed as many of the elder gods' idols as they could find, before finally deciding to leave Mars for Earth, where the elder gods have no interest. It was for this reason that the Martians sent out their psychic spies – of which Howard apparently was one. By this time, the colour out of space begins to fade, and Howard finds himself on Mars, in a vast hall filled with "mathematically-perfect music". Howard enters the hall, and as he does, the Martian inhabitants begin to exit in fear; Howard realized the cause when he looks up and sees that one of the feared elder gods is standing within the hall. Howard approaches it – and realizes that he is standing before a mirror.

The narration states that the shock of this sent Howard back to Earth, with no memories of the event, and in later years he became one of the skeptics who claimed there had never been a Martian invasion of the Earth.

Other notes
Howard described the Martians as eldritch in appearance, and uses descriptions similar to the appearance of Cthulhu and the Elder Things.
The narrative notes Howard's early rejection of Santa Claus and embrace of atheism.
Howard's mother refers to him as Abdul Alhazred.
Howard mentions cylinders landing in London, Paris, St. Louis, and Texas (referring to other stories from Global Dispatches) and also mentions the irony of Martians landing in Providence's Italian section when it was Giovanni Schiaparelli who discovered the Martian canals.
Howard mentions that one of the very few things in the world that seemed true to him were "certain tales in The Arabian Nights", echoing statements of Lovecraftian characters concerning the Necronomicon.
The back cover of Global Dispatches depicts three Martian tripods excavating something amid icebound glaciers; this is presumably them seeking the remains of their lost Antarctic colony.

References

Alternate history short stories
Crossover fiction
Short stories set on Mars
Cthulhu Mythos short stories
War of the Worlds written fiction
1996 short stories
Fiction set in 1898